Pointed Sticks are a Canadian punk rock/new wave band from Vancouver. Originally active from 1978 to 1981, then reuniting to perform in July 2006 through to November 2012. After a three-year hiatus, Pointed Sticks returned to the stage in June 2015 for shows on Vancouver island as well as the July 11th Khatsahlano street party in Vancouver (sporadic live appearances have continued into 2016). The band is known for their fast melodic pop music and liberal use of harmony singing by all five members—also for unusual graphic images that acted as counterpoint to the music.

They were the first Canadian band signed to Stiff Records, although the label was going through financial problems and never released an album by the band. The original band consisted of vocalist Nick Jones, guitarist Bill Napier-Hemy, bassist Tony Bardach and drummer Ian Tiles. Keyboard player Gord Nicholl joined soon after. Johnny Ferreira later joined on saxophone, Bardach was replaced by Scott Watson on bass, and Tiles was replaced by drummer Robert Bruce (from Active Dog), and later by Ken "Dimwit" Montgomery (who was also known for stints in the Subhumans and D.O.A.). The band released four singles, (including their only Stiff records release, a 3-song 7") before releasing their first full-length album, Perfect Youth in 1980. Members of the band were featured in Dennis Hopper's 1980 film, Out of the Blue.

The first compilation of their recordings was released in 1995 on Zulu Records. Part Of The Noise, now out of print, included five songs from the Perfect Youth album as well as 45's and rarities. In 2005, the complete Perfect Youth album, with four bonus tracks, was reissued by Sudden Death Records, followed the next year by a compilation of singles, outtakes, and other rarities, entitled Waiting for the Real Thing, also on Sudden Death. These two releases do not share or repeat any tracks.

The original band members reunited in 2006 for a tour of Japan, and continued to play sporadic concerts in Canada and the United States. In 2009 the band recorded an album of all new material, Three Lefts Make A Right, released November 1 of that year on Northern Electric records.  The band returned to Japan in August 2010 with support from a re-united Dishrags, their all female contemporaries from the original Vancouver Punk scene. Pointed Sticks  participated in a Vancouver benefit concert for Japan earthquake relief on May 12, 2011. "Three Lefts Make a Right" was mixed by Vancouver's Mike Fraser. The complete Stiff Sessions recordings were released on CD in Japan in 2008, on the Base label. A third full-length album titled Pointed Sticks was released on the Northern Electric label via Sudden Death Distribution.

The Pointed Sticks were featured in the 2010 documentary film Bloodied but Unbowed, directed by  Susanne Tabata.

Name
The band gets its name from dialogue in a famous sketch by Monty Python, "Self-Defence Against Fresh Fruit," wherein Eric Idle repeatedly suggests that learning to defend against something like a pointed stick might be more useful than defending against fresh fruit. They chose this name after discovering that their first six choices had all been taken. At the beginning of their career they were briefly known as "Ernie Dick and the Pointed Sticks".

References

External links
 Pointed Sticks on MySpace
 Johnny Ferreira official website
 Pointed Sticks at allmusic

Musical groups established in 1978
Musical groups disestablished in 1981
Musical groups reestablished in 2006
Musical groups from Vancouver
Canadian punk rock groups
Canadian new wave musical groups
1978 establishments in British Columbia
1981 disestablishments in British Columbia
2006 establishments in British Columbia
Canadian garage rock groups